Religious circumcision generally occurs shortly after birth, during childhood, or around puberty as part of a rite of passage. Circumcision is most prevalent in the religions of Judaism and Islam. Circumcision for religious reasons is most prominently practiced by members of the Jewish and Islamic faiths.

Abrahamic religions

Judaism

According to the Torah and Halakha (Jewish religious law), ritual circumcision of all male Jews and their slaves (Genesis ) is a commandment from God that Jews are obligated to perform on the eighth day of birth, and is only postponed or abrogated in the case of threat to the life or health of the child. Jews believe that Gentiles (i. e. non-Jews) are neither required nor obligated to follow this commandment, since it is considered binding exclusively for the Jewish people; according to the Jewish law, only the Seven Laws of Noah apply to non-Jews.

In the Hebrew Bible

There are numerous references to circumcision in the Hebrew Bible. Circumcision was enjoined upon the biblical patriarch Abraham, his descendants and their slaves as "a token of the covenant" concluded with him by God for all generations, an "everlasting covenant", thus it is commonly observed by two (Judaism and Islam) of the Abrahamic religions.

The penalty of non-observance was kareth (Hebrew: "cutting off") from the people (Leviticus ). Non-Israelites had to undergo circumcision before they could be allowed to take part in the feast of Passover (Exodus ). (See also Mosaic Law directed at non-Jews and Conversion to Judaism).

It was "a reproach" for an Israelite to be uncircumcised (Joshua ). The name arelim ("uncircumcised") became an opprobrious term, especially a pejorative name for the Philistines, who might have been of Greek origin, in the context of the fierce wars recounted in the First Book of Samuel. When the general (and future king) David wanted to marry King Saul's daughter, the King required a grisly "dowry" of a hundred Philistine foreskins]]. David went further: "and David arose and went, he and his men, and slew of the Philistines two hundred men; and David brought their foreskins, and they gave them in full number to the king, that he might be the king's son-in-law. And Saul gave him Michal his daughter to wife".

"Uncircumcised" is used in conjunction with tame ("impure") for heathen (Isaiah ). The word arel ("uncircumcised") is also employed for "impermeable" ("their uncircumcised hearts"; compare Jeremiah ; Ezekiel ); it is also applied to the first three years' fruit of a tree, which is forbidden. "The Philistines, more than any other nation, are regularly called uncircumised" in the Hebrew Bible.

However, the Israelites born in the wilderness after the Exodus from Egypt apparently did not carry out the practice of circumcision. In any case, we are told that Joshua, before the celebration of the Passover, had them circumcised at Gilgal.

The Hebrew Bible contains several narratives in which circumcision is mentioned.

There is another sense in which the term "circumcise" is used in the Hebrew Bible. (the New JPS Tanakh translates: "Their ears are blocked").  says that circumcised and uncircumcised will be punished alike by the Lord; for "all the nations are uncircumcised, and all the house of Israel are uncircumcised in heart." The New JPS Tanakh translation adds the note: "uncircumcised of heart: I.e., their minds are blocked to God's commandments." Non-Jewish tribes that practiced circumcision were described as being "circumcised in uncircumcision."()

Intertestamental period

The deuterocanonical books and biblical apocrypha reveal the cultural clash between Jews and Greeks, and between Judaizers and Hellenizers. Both Greeks and Romans valued the foreskin positively, and when they took part in athletic sports or trained in the gymnasium, they did it in the nude. They insisted that the glans had to remain covered, as they strongly disapproved of the custom of circumcision, which was regarded as a cruel and barbaric genital mutilation. The Books of the Maccabees reveal that many Jewish men chose to undergo epispasm, the ancient practice of foreskin restoration by stretching the residual skin, so that they could conform to Greek culture and take part in these sports; some also left their sons uncircumcised. This relatively peaceful period came to an end when Antiochus IV Epiphanes attacked first Egypt and then sacked and looted Jerusalem. Epiphanes determined to force everyone to live the Greek way and abandon the Jewish way. Among other things, he banned circumcision.

Although many Hellenized Jews were prepared to conform to Greek culture, observant Jews saw circumcision as a mark of Jewish loyalty and many who kept to the Mosaic Law defied the edict of Antiochus Epiphanes prohibiting circumcision (and ). Jewish women showed their loyalty to the Law, even at the risk of their lives, by themselves circumcising their sons. "For example, two women were brought in for having circumcised their children. They publicly paraded them around the city, with their babies hanging at their breasts, and then hurled them down headlong from the wall." At the same time, the Zealots forcibly circumcised the uncircumcised boys within the borders of Israel.

The Book of Jubilees, part of the Ethiopian Orthodox biblical canon, written in the time of John Hyrcanus, reveals the hostility directed against those who abandoned circumcision (xv. 26–27): "Whosoever is uncircumcised belongs to 'the sons of Belial,' to 'the children of doom and eternal perdition'; for all the angels of the Presence and of the Glorification have been so from the day of their creation, and God's anger will be kindled against the children of the covenant if they make the members of their body appear like those of the Gentiles, and they will be expelled and exterminated from the earth".

According to the Gospel of Thomas saying 53, Jesus says:

Paul's point was to overturn many Jewish laws, not just circumcision, because what you ate, who you ate with and other technical observations of the law were no longer required in Christ's new kingdom on earth. 

The Jewish Encyclopedia in the article "Gentiles", section "Gentiles May Not Be Taught the Torah", states:

In rabbinic literature
Some rabbinical sources indicate that even before the covenant of Abraham, the aposthia of Shem may have been an inspiration for circumcision, although the aposthia of Shem is not specifically mentioned in the text of Genesis. During the Babylonian exile, Sabbath and circumcision became the characteristic symbols of the Jewish people. However, the Talmud orders that a boy must not be circumcised if he had two brothers, from the same mother as him, who have died as a result of their circumcisions; this may be due to a concern about haemophilia.

Contact with Hellenistic culture, especially at the games of the arena, made this distinction obnoxious to Jewish Hellenists seeking to assimilate into Greek culture. The consequence was their attempt to appear like the Greeks by epispasm ("making themselves foreskins"; ; Josephus, Ant. xii 5, § 1; Assumption of Moses, viii.; ;, Tosef.; Talmud tractes Shabbat xv. 9; Yevamot 72a, b; Yerushalmi Peah i. 16b; Yevamot viii. 9a).  records that after Antiochus IV Epiphanes effectively banned traditional Jewish religious practice, including circumcision, the Maccabean rebels "forcibly circumcised all the uncircumcised boys they found within the borders of Israel." Circumcision was again banned by Emperor Hadrian (117-138 CE). His anti-circumcision law is considered by many to be one of the main causes of the Jewish Bar Kokhba revolt (132-135 CE).

Around 140 CE Rabbinic Judaism made its circumcision requirements stricter. Jewish circumcision includes the removal of the inner preputial epithelium, in a procedure that is called priah(Hebrew: פריעה), which means: 'uncovering'. This epithelium is also removed on modern medical circumcisions, to prevent post operative penile adhesion and its complications. According to rabbinic interpretation of the traditional Jewish sources, the periah has been performed, as part of Jewish circumcision, since the Israelites first inhabited the Land of Israel, and without it the mitzvah is not performed at all. 
However, the editors of the Oxford Dictionary of the Jewish Religion, note that periah was probably added by the rabbis, in order to "prevent the possibility of obliterating the traces of circumcision". Jewish law states that circumcision is a mitzva aseh ("positive commandment" to perform an act) and is obligatory for Jewish-born males and for non-circumcised Jewish male converts. It is only postponed or abrogated in the case of threat to the life or health of the child. It is usually performed by a mohel on the eighth day of life in a ceremony called a brit milah (or bris milah, colloquially simply bris), which means "Covenant of circumcision" in Hebrew. According to Jewish law, the foreskin should be buried after a brit milah. The rite is considered of such importance that in Orthodox communities, the body of an uncircumcised Jewish male will sometimes be circumcised before burial. Although 19th century Reform leaders described it as "barbaric", the practice of circumcision "remained a central rite" and the Union for Reform Judaism has, since 1984, trained and certified over 300 practicing mohels under its "Berit Mila Program". Humanistic Judaism argues that "circumcision is not required for Jewish identity." The Jewish circumcision consists of three procedures, the first being the amputation of the foreskin. The second is the priah, or peeling back of the epithelium after the foreskin has been amputated. According to Shaye J. D. Cohen, in Why Aren't Jewish Women Circumcised?: Gender and Covenant in Judaism, pg 25, the Torah only commands circumcision (milah). David Gollaher has written that the rabbis added the procedure of periah to discourage men from trying to restore their foreskins: "Once established, periah was deemed essential to circumcision; if the mohel failed to cut away enough tissue, the operation was deemed insufficient to comply with God's covenant" and "Depending on the strictness of individual rabbis, boys (or men thought to have been inadequately cut) were subjected to additional operations." In addition to milah (the actual circumcision) and priah, mentioned above, the Talmud mentions a third step, metzitzah, or squeezing some blood from the wound and oral suction by mouths of mohels.

The book Abot De-Rabbi Natan (The Fathers According to Rabbi Nathan) contains a list of persons from the Israelite Scriptures that were born circumcised:
Adam, Seth, Noah, Shem, Jacob, Joseph, Moses, the wicked Balaam, Samuel, David, Jeremiah and Zerubbabel. To be born without a foreskin was regarded as the privilege of the most saintly of people, from Adam, "who was made in the image of God," and Moses to Zerubbabel (see Midrash Ab. R. N., ed. Schechter, p. 153; and Talmud, Sotah 12a). Uncircumcision being considered a blemish, circumcision was to remove it, and to render Abraham and his descendants "perfect" (Talmud Ned. 31b; Midrash Genesis Rabbah xlvi.)

Rabbinic literature holds that one who removes his circumcision has no portion in the world to come (Mishnah Ab. iii. 17; Midrash Sifre, Num. xv. 31; Talmud Sanhedrin 99).

According to the Midrash Pirke R. El. xxix., it was Shem who circumcised Abraham and Ishmael on the Day of Atonement; and the blood of the covenant then shed is ever before God on that day to serve as an atoning power. According to the same midrash, Pharaoh prevented the Hebrew slaves from performing the rite, but when the Passover time came and brought them deliverance, they underwent circumcision, and mingled the blood of the paschal lamb with that of the Abrahamic covenant, wherefore (Ezek. xvi. 6) God repeats the words: "In thy blood live!"

During the nineteenth and twentieth centuries many Jewish reformers, doctors in Central and Eastern Europe proposed to replace circumcision with a symbolic ceremony, while others sought to ban or abolish circumcision entirely, as it was perceived as a dangerous, barbaric and pagan ritual of genital mutilation that could transmit infectious diseases to newborns. The first formal objection to circumcision within Judaism occurred in 1843 in Frankfurt. The Society for the Friends of Reform, a group that criticised traditional Jewish practices, said that brit milah was not a mitzvah but an outworn legacy from Israel's earlier phases, an obsolete throwback to primitive religion. With the expanding role of medicine came further opposition; certain aspects of Jewish circumcision such as periah and metzitzah (drawing the blood from the circumcision wound through sucking or a cloth) were deemed unhygienic and dangerous for the newborns. Later evidence that syphilis and tuberculosis – two of the most feared infectious diseases in the 19th century – were spread by mohels, caused various rabbis to advocate metzitzah to be done using a sponge or a tube.

Converts to Judaism
According to the Hebrew Bible, conversion to Judaism for non-Israelites necessitated circumcision. In the 1st century CE, there was a controversy between the Shammaites and the Hillelites regarding a convert born without a foreskin: the former demanding the spilling of a drop of blood of the covenant; the latter declaring it to be unnecessary.

Flavius Josephus in Jewish Antiquities book 20, chapter 2 recorded the story of King Izates of Adiabene who decided to follow the Law of Moses at the advice of a Jewish merchant named Ananias. He was going to get circumcised, but his mother, Helen, who herself embraced the Jewish customs, advised against it on the grounds that the subjects would not stand to be ruled by someone who followed such "strange and foreign rites". Ananias likewise advised against it, on the grounds that worship of God was superior to circumcision (Robert Eisenman in James the Brother of Jesus claims that Ananias is Paul the Apostle who held similar views) and that God would forgive him for fear of his subjects. So Izates decided against it. However, later, "a certain other Jew that came out of Galilee, whose name was Eleazar", who was well versed in the Law, convinced him that he should, on the grounds that it was one thing to read the Law and another thing to practice it, and so he did. Once Helen and Ananias found out, they were struck by great fear of the possible consequences, but as Josephus put it, God looked after Izates. As his reign was peaceful and blessed, Helen visited the Jerusalem Temple to thank God, and since there was a terrible famine at the time, she brought much food and aid to the people of Jerusalem.

On the other hand, the emperor Hadrian (117-138 CE) forbade circumcision. His successor Antoninus Pius (138-161 CE) upheld the decree, but around 140 included an exemption for Jews who circumcised their sons, although not their servants, slaves, or converts. Even before that, in 95 CE, Flavius Clemens, a nephew of the emperors Titus and Domitian, suffered the penalty of death for undergoing circumcision, and embracing the Jewish faith with his wife Domitilla (see Grätz, "Gesch." iv. 403 et seq., 702).

It can be thus understood why during Early Christian times there existed groups of God-fearers, who were Gentiles who shared religious ideas and practices with Jews, to one degree or another, but refused to circumcise, and were not recognized as Jews. It is possible that the view of them is echoed in the Midrash: "If thy sons accept My Godhead [by undergoing circumcision] I shall be their God and bring them into the land; but if they do not observe My covenant in regard either to circumcision or to the Sabbath, they shall not enter the land of promise" (Midrash Genesis Rabbah xlvi.). "The Sabbath-keepers who are not circumcised are intruders, and deserve punishment," (Midrash Deut. Rabbah i.)

The uncompromising Jewish stance that the seal of circumcision might not find its substitute in "the seal of baptism" — led the Apostle Paul to urge the latter in opposition to the former (and elsewhere), just as he was led to adopt the antinomistic or antinational view, which had its exponents in Alexandria.

Currently, the issue of circumcising converts remains controversial in Reform and Reconstructionist Judaism and it is not mandatory in either movement.

Normative position
Subject to overriding medical considerations, the circumcision must take place eight days after the birth of the child, even when this falls on Shabbat. The child must be medically fit for a circumcision to be performed, and Jewish law prohibits parents having their son circumcised if medical doctors hold that the procedure may unduly threaten the child's health (e.g. because of hemophilia). If by reason of the child's debility or sickness the ceremony is postponed, it cannot take place on Shabbat.

It is the duty of the father to have his child circumcised; and if he fails in this, the beth din of the city must see that the rite is performed. According to traditional Jewish law, in the absence of a grown free Jewish male expert, a woman, a slave, or a child, that has the required skills, is also authorized to perform the circumcision, provided that she or he is Jewish. However, most streams of non-Orthodox Judaism allow female mohels, called mohalot (plural of  mohelet, feminine of mohel), without restriction. In 1984, Deborah Cohen became the first certified Reform mohelet; she was certified by the Berit Mila program of Reform Judaism.

However important it may be in Judaism, circumcision is not a sacrament, unlike a Christian baptism. Circumcision does not affect a Jew's Jewish status; a Jew by birth is a full Jew, even if not circumcised. Even so, the punishment for not being circumcised in rabbinic Judaism is believed to be kareth, "being cut off"; meaning premature death at the hand of G-d (Mo'ed Katan 28a) and a severe spiritual punishment, the "soul's being cut off," and not being granted a share in the world to come (Hilchot Teshuvah 8:1,5).

Christianity

The first Council of Jerusalem (c. 50) declared that circumcision was not necessary for new Gentile converts (a record of the council is found in ); covenant theology largely views the Christian sacrament of baptism as fulfilling the Israelite practice of circumcision, both being signs and seals of the covenant of grace.

In Western Christianity, the Catholic Church at the Council of Florence condemned the practice of circumcision for Christians, with Catholic Christian moralists preaching against the practice; the Lutheran churches have historically taught that Christians should not be circumcised. The Catholic Church currently maintains a neutral position on the practice of cultural circumcision, as the church has a policy of inculturation.

Circumcision is considered a customary practice among Oriental Christian denominations such as the Coptic, Ethiopian, and Eritrean Orthodox churches, as well as some other African churches. The Ethiopian Orthodox Church calls for circumcision, with near-universal prevalence among Orthodox men in Ethiopia. Some Christian churches in South Africa oppose circumcision, viewing it as a pagan ritual, while others, including the Nomiya church in Kenya, require circumcision for membership.

While circumcision is not observed by the majority of Christians in most parts of the Christian world and mainstream Christian denominations don't require circumcision, it is still practiced among some Christian communities.  Circumcision is also widely practiced among Christian communities in the Anglosphere countries, Oceania, South Korea, the Philippines, the Middle East, and Africa, As of 2007, fifty-five percent of newborn males in the United States were circumcised, a significant decline from years past. Countries like Australia and Canada have much lower rates of circumcision, and the United Kingdom is considering an outright ban. Circumcision is rare for Christians in the countries of Europe, East Asia, parts of Africa, as well as in India and until recently in Southern Africa. Christians in the East and West Indies (excluding the Philippines) do not practice it either. Circumcision is near universal among Christian countries of Oceania,  and in North, East and West Africa. And it is common among Christians in countries such as Cameroon, Democratic Republic of the Congo, Ethiopia, Eritrea, Ghana, Liberia, Nigeria and Kenya, and is also widely practiced among Christians from Philippines, South Korea, Egypt, Syria, Lebanon, Jordan, Palestine, Israel, and North Africa.

According to the Acts of the Apostles, chapter 15, the Jewish Christian leaders of the early Church at the Council of Jerusalem rejected circumcision as a requirement for Gentile converts, possibly the first act of differentiation of Early Christianity from its Jewish roots (See also: List of events in early Christianity). The rite of circumcision was especially execrable in Classical civilization because it was the custom to spend an hour a day or so exercising nude in the gymnasium and in Roman baths, therefore Jewish men did not want to be seen in public deprived of their foreskins. Hellenistic and Roman culture both found circumcision to be cruel and repulsive.

Paul the Apostle, who called himself "Apostle to the Gentiles", attacked the practice but not consistently; for example, in one case he personally circumcised Timothy "because of the Jews" that were in town (Timothy had a Jewish Christian mother but a Greek father ).

Paul argued that circumcision no longer meant the physical, but a spiritual practice. And in that sense, he wrote : "Is any man called being circumcised? let him not become uncircumcised"—probably a reference to the practice of epispasm. Paul was already circumcised ("on the eighth day") when he was "called". He added: "Is any called in uncircumcision? let him not be circumcised", and went on to argue that circumcision did not matter: "Circumcision is nothing and uncircumcision is nothing. Keeping God's commands is what counts".

Later he more explicitly denounced the practice, rejecting and condemning those who promoted circumcision to Gentile Christians. He accused those Judaizers who advocated circumcision of turning from the Spirit to the flesh. In the Epistle to the Galatians, Paul warned Gentile Christians that the advocates of circumcision were "false brothers", and wrote: "Are you so foolish, that, whereas you began in the Spirit, you would now be made perfect by the flesh?"; he also wrote: "Listen! I, Paul, am telling you that if you let yourselves be circumcised, Christ will be of no benefit to you". He accused circumcision advocates of wanting to make a good showing in the flesh, and of glorying or boasting of the flesh. Paul in his letters fiercely criticized the Judaizers that demanded circumcision for Gentile converts, and opposed them; he stressed instead that faith in Christ constituted a New Covenant with God, a covenant which essentially provides the justification and salvation for Gentiles from the harsh edicts of the Mosaic Law, a New Covenant that did not require circumcision (see also Justification by faith, Pauline passages supporting antinomianism, Abrogation of Old Covenant laws).

Paul, the Apostle to the Gentiles, charged that the advocates of circumcision were "false brothers". Some Biblical scholars think that the Epistle to Titus, generally attributed to Paul, may state that circumcision should be discouraged among Christians, although others believe this is merely a reference to Jews. Circumcision was so closely associated with Jewish men that Jewish Christians were referred to as "those of the circumcision" or conversely Christians who were circumcised were referred to as Jewish Christians or Judaizers. These terms (circumcised/uncircumcised) are generally interpreted to mean Jews and Greeks, who were predominate, however it is an oversimplification as 1st century Iudaea Province also had some Jews who no longer circumcised (see Hellenistic Judaism), and some Greeks (see proselytes or Judaizers) and others such as Egyptians, Ethiopians, and Arabs who did.

The Lutheran Church and the Greek Orthodox Church celebrate the Circumcision of Christ on 1 January, while Orthodox churches following the Julian calendar celebrate it on 14 January. All Orthodox churches consider it a "Great Feast". In much of Western Christianity, the Feast of the Circumcision of Christ has been replaced by other commemorations, such as the Solemnity of Mary, Mother of God in the Roman Catholic Church or the Feast of the Holy Name of Jesus in the Lutheran Churches. There are, however, notable exceptions, such as among most Traditionalist Catholics, who reject Novus Ordo and other changes following Vatican II to varying degrees, thereby maintaining the feast as a Holy day of obligation.

Roman Catholic Church 
Historically, the Roman Catholic Church denounced religious circumcision for its members in the Cantate Domino, written during the 11th Council of Florence in 1442, warning of loss of salvation for converts who observe it. This decision was based on the belief that baptism had superseded circumcision, and may also have been a response to Coptic Christians, who continued to practice circumcision.

Origen stated in his work Contra Celsum that circumcision "was discontinued by Jesus, who desired that His disciples should not practise it."

Pope Pius XII taught that circumcision is only "[morally] permissible if, in accordance with therapeutic principles, it prevents a disease that cannot be countered in any other way."

On another instance, he stated:

The Church has been viewed as maintaining a neutral position on the practice of cultural circumcision, due to its policy of inculturation, though Catholic scholars, including John J. Dietzen, David Lang, and Edwin F. Healy, argue that the church condemns it as "elective male infant circumcision not only violates the proper application of the time-honored principle of totality, but even fits the ethical definition of mutilation, which is gravely sinful."

Catholic moralists such as Fr. John J. Dietzen, a priest and columnist, have argued that paragraph number 2297 from the Catholic Catechism (Respect for bodily integrity) makes the practice of elective and neonatal circumcision immoral. John Paul Slosar and Daniel O'Brien, however, argue that the therapeutic benefits of neonatal circumcision are inconclusive, but that recent findings that circumcision may prevent disease puts the practice outside the realm of paragraph 2297. They also argue that statements regarding mutilation and amputation in the "Respect for bodily integrity" paragraph are made within the context of kidnapping, hostage taking or torture, and that if circumcision is defined as an amputation, any removal of tissue or follicle, regardless of its effect on functional integrity, could be considered a violation of moral law. The proportionality of harm versus benefit of medical procedures, as defined by Directives 29 and 33 of the Ethical and Religious Directives for Catholic Health Care Services (National Conference of Catholic Bishops), have also been interpreted to support and reject the practice of circumcision. These arguments represent the conscience of the individual writers, and not the official stance of the Church. The most recent statement from the Church was that of Pope Emeritus Benedict XVI:
The Church of Antioch sent Barnabas on a mission with Paul, which became known as the Apostle's first missionary journey . . . Together with Paul, he then went to the so-called Council of Jerusalem where after a profound examination of the question, the Apostles with the Elders decided to discontinue the practice of circumcision so that it was no longer a feature of the Christian identity (cf. Acts 15: 1-35). It was only in this way that, in the end, they officially made possible the Church of the Gentiles, a Church without circumcision; we are children of Abraham simply through faith in Christ.

With the exception of the commemoration of the circumcision of Jesus in accordance with Jewish practice, circumcision has not been part of Catholic practice. According to an epistle of Cyprian of Carthage, circumcision of the flesh was replaced by circumcision of the spirit.

The Latter Day Saint movement
Passages from scriptures connected with the Latter Day Saint movement (Mormons) explain that the "law of circumcision is done away" by Christ and thus unnecessary from a religious standpoint.

Druze faith
Circumcision is widely practiced by the Druze, the procedure is practiced as a cultural tradition, and has no religious significance in the Druze faith. There is no special date for this act in the Druze faith: male Druze infants are usually circumcised shortly after birth, however some remain uncircumcised until the age of ten or older. Some Druses do not circumcise their male children, and refuse to observe this "common Muslim practice".

Islam

The origin of circumcision in Islam is a matter of religious and scholarly debate. It is mentioned in some hadith and the sunnah, but it is not found anywhere in the Quran. In the time of the Islamic prophet Muhammad, circumcision was carried out by Pagan Arabian tribes, and circumcision by the Jewish tribes of Arabia for religious reasons. This has also been attested by the Muslim scholar al-Jahiz, as well as by the Roman Jewish historian Flavius Josephus.

The four schools of Islamic jurisprudence have different opinions and attitudes towards circumcision.Some state that it is recommendable, others that it is permissible but not binding, while others regard it as a legal obligation. According to Shafi‘i and Hanbali jurists male circumcision is obligatory for Muslims, while Hanafi jurists consider circumcision to be recommendable exclusively for Muslim males on the seventh day after birth. Some Salafis have argued that circumcision is required in Islam to provide ritual cleanliness based on the covenant with Abraham. 

Whereas Jewish circumcision is closely bound by ritual timing and tradition, in Islam there is no fixed age for circumcision. Therefore, there is a wide variation in practice among Muslim communities, with children often being circumcised in late childhood or early adolescence. It depends on family, region, and country. The age when boys get circumcised, and the procedures used, tend to change across cultures, families, and time. In some Muslim-majority countries, circumcision is performed on Muslim boys after they have learned to recite the whole Quran from start to finish. In Malaysia and other regions, the boy usually undergoes the operation between the ages of ten and twelve, and is thus a puberty rite, serving to introduce him into the new status of an adult. The procedure is sometimes semi-public, accompanied with music, special foods, and much festivity.

There is no equivalent of a Jewish mohel in Islam. Circumcisions are usually carried out in health facilities or hospitals, and performed by trained medical practitioners. The circumciser can be either male or female, and is not required to be a Muslim, and is not required of, converts to Islam.

Indian religions

There is no reference to circumcision in the Hindu holy books, and both Hinduism and Buddhism appear to have a neutral view on circumcision. However, Hinduism discourages non-medical circumcision, as according to them, the body is made by the almighty God, and nobody has right to alter it without the concern of the person who is going for it. Certain Hindu gurus consider it to be directly against nature and God's design.
 
Sikh infants are not circumcised. Sikhism does not require circumcision of either males or females, and criticizes the practice. For example, Bhagat Kabir criticizes the practise of circumcision in the following hymn of Guru Granth Sahib.

Africa

In West Africa, infant circumcision had religious significance as a rite of passage or otherwise in the past; today in some non-Muslim Nigerian societies it is medicalised and is simply a cultural norm. In many West African traditional societies circumcision has become medicalised and is simply performed in infancy without ado or any particular conscious cultural significance. Among the Urhobo of southern Nigeria it is symbolic of a boy entering into manhood. The ritual expression, Omo te Oshare ("the boy is now man"), constitutes a rite of passage from one age set to another.

In East Africa, specifically in Kenya among various so-classified Bantu and Nilotic peoples, such as the Maragoli and Idakho of the Luhya super-ethnic group, the Kikuyu, Kalenjin and Maasai, circumcision is a rite of passage observed collectively by a number of boys every few years, and boys circumcised at the same time are taken to be members of a single age set.

Authority derives from the age-group and the age-set. Prior to circumcision a natural leader or Olaiguenani is selected; he leads his age-group through a series of rituals until old age, sharing responsibility with a select few, of whom the ritual expert (Oloiboni) is the ultimate authority. Masai youths are not circumcised until they are mature, and a new age-set is initiated together at regular intervals of twelve to fifteen years. The young warriors (Il-Murran) remain initiates for some time, using blunt arrows to hunt small birds which are stuffed and tied to a frame to form a head-dress. Traditionally, among the Luhya, boys of certain age-sets, typically between 8 and 18 years of age would, under the leadership of specific men engage in various rites leading up to the day of circumcision. After circumcision, they would live apart from the rest of society for a certain number of days. Not even their mothers nor sisters would be allowed to see them.

The Xhosa Tribe from the Eastern Cape in South Africa has a circumcision ritual. The ceremony is part of a transition to manhood. It is called the Abakwetha - "A Group Learning". A group of normally five aged between 16 and 20 go off for three months and live in a special hut (sutu). The circumcision is the climax of the ritual. Nelson Mandela describes his experiences undergoing this ritual in his biography, Long Walk to Freedom. Traditional circumcisions are often performed in unsterile conditions where no anesthetic is administered; improper treatment of the wound can lead to sepsis and dehydration, which has in the past lead to initiate deaths.

Among some West African animist groups, such as the Dogon and Dowayo, circumcision represents a removal of "feminine" aspects of the male, turning boys into fully masculine males.

Ancient Egypt

Sixth Dynasty (2345 - 2181 BC) tomb artwork in Egypt is thought to be the oldest documentary evidence of circumcision, the most ancient depiction being a bas-relief from the necropolis at Saqqara (ca. 2400 B.C) with the inscription reading "Hold him and do not allow him to faint". In the oldest written account, by an Egyptian named Uha, in the 23rd century B.C, he describes a mass circumcision and boasts of his ability to stoically endure the pain: "When I was circumcised, together with one hundred and twenty men ... there was none thereof who hit out, there was none thereof who was hit, and there was none thereof who scratched and there was none thereof who was scratched."

Circumcision in ancient Egypt was thought to be a mark of passage from childhood to adulthood. The alteration of the body and ritual of circumcision was supposed to give access to ancient mysteries reserved solely for the initiated. The content of those mysteries are unclear but are likely to be myths, prayers, and incantations central to Egyptian religion. The Egyptian Book of the Dead, for example, tells of the sun god Ra performing a self-circumcision, whose blood created two minor guardian deities. Circumcisions were performed by priests in a public ceremony, using a stone blade. It is thought to have been more popular among the upper echelons of the society, although it was not universal and those lower down the social order are known to have had the procedure done.

Asia
In early 2007 it was announced that rural aidpost orderlies in the East Sepik Province of Papua New Guinea are to undergo training in the circumcision of men and boys of all ages with a view to introducing the procedure as a means of prophylaxis against HIV/AIDS, which is becoming a significant problem in the country.

Neither the Avesta nor the Zoroastrian Pahlavi texts mention circumcision, traditionally, Zoroastrians do not practice circumcision. Circumcision is not required in Yazidism, but is practised by some Yazidis due to regional customs. 

Circumcision is forbidden in Mandaeism, and the sign of the Jews given to Abraham by God, circumcision, is considered abhorrent by the Mandaeans. According to the Mandaean doctrine a circumcised man cannot serve as a Mandaean priest.

Circumcision in South Korea is largely the result of American cultural and military influence following the Korean War.

The origin of circumcision (tuli) in the Philippines is uncertain. One newspaper article speculates that it is due to the influence of Western colonisation, however, Antonio de Morga's 17th-century History of the Philippine Islands documents its existence in pre-Colonial Philippines, owing it to Islamic influence.

Circumcision is not a religious practice of the Bahá'í Faith, and leaves that decision up to the parents.

Oceania
Circumcision is part of initiation rites in some Pacific Islander, and Australian aboriginal traditions in areas such as Arnhem Land, where the practice was introduced by Makassan traders from Sulawesi in the Indonesian Archipelago.  Circumcision ceremonies among certain Australian aboriginal societies are noted for their painful nature, including subincision for some aboriginal peoples in the Western Desert.

In the Pacific, ritual circumcision is nearly universal in the Melanesian islands of Fiji and Vanuatu; participation in the traditional land diving on Pentecost Island is reserved for those who have been circumcised. Circumcision is also commonly practised in the Polynesian islands of Samoa, Tonga, Niue, and Tikopia. In Samoa, it is accompanied by a celebration.

See also
 History of circumcision
 Prevalence of circumcision

References

Works cited:

 Glick, Leonard B. Marked in Your Flesh: Circumcision from Ancient Judea to Modern America. New York: Oxford University Press, 2005.

The rabbinic literature and Converts to Judaism are sections are an evolution of the corresponding article which gives the following
Bibliography:

 Pocock, Specimen Historiœ Arabum, pp. 319 et seq.;
 Millo, Histoire du Mahométisme, p. 350;
 Hoffmann, Beschneidung, in Ersch and Gruber, Encyc.;
 Steinschneider, Die Beschneidung der Araber und Muhammedaner, in Glassberg, Die Beschneidung;
 Jolly, Etude Critique du Manuel Opératoire des Musulmans et des Israélites, Paris, 1899.

External links

24th-century BC establishments
 
Gender and religion
Religious practices
Rites of passage
Sexuality and religion